Piedicolle is a  of the  of Collazzone in the Province of Perugia, Umbria, central Italy. It stands at an elevation of 324 metres above sea level. At the time of the Istat census of 2001 it had 115 inhabitants.

References 

Frazioni of the Province of Perugia